The Fencing Competition at the 1951 Mediterranean Games was held in Alexandria, Egypt.

Medalists

Medal table

References
1951 Mediterranean Games report at the International Committee of Mediterranean Games (CIJM) website
List of Olympians who won medals at the Mediterranean Games at Olympedia.org

M
Sports at the 1951 Mediterranean Games
1951
International fencing competitions hosted by Egypt